In Old Cheyenne is a 1931 Western film directed by Stuart Paton.  It is a re-make of the 1930 film Phantom of the Desert.

The plot centers around a team of horse rustling ranch foreman and ranch hands who blame a number of missing horses on a wild stallion that lives in the nearby hills. Someone is rustling the horses at the Sutter ranch and the Cheyenne Kid tries to find out who the outlaws really are.

Cast
Rex Lease as Jim
Dorothy Gulliver as Helen Sutter
Jay Hunt as Frank Sutter
Harry Woods as Winslow
Harry Todd as Ben
Source:

References

External links

 http://www.allmovie.com/movie/in-old-cheyenne-v96404 

American Western (genre) films
1931 Western (genre) films
1931 films
American black-and-white films
Films directed by Stuart Paton
1930s American films